The Bahraini King's Cup is a cup competition involving teams from the Bahraini Premier League and 2nd tier. Hidd SCC are the current holders of the King's Cup, having defeated Busaiteen in extra time in last year's final.

Draw
The official draw took place on 24 December 2015.

Preliminary round
3 teams played a knockout tie. 3 ties were played over one leg. The first match was played between Al-Shabab and Isa Town Club on 28 December 2015. Al-Shabab, Al-Ittihad Bahrain and Qalali Club advanced to the Round of 16 after winning their respective ties.

Round of 16
The round of 16 had the 3 winners from the previous round, alongside 13 new entrants: 10 from the First Division and 3 from the Second Division. The draw was made 24 December 2015 with the preliminary round draw. 8 teams advanced from this round into the Quarterfinals. The draw for the upcoming rounds was also made on the same day as the preliminary round Draw.

Quarter finals
4 teams advanced from this round into the Semifinals.

Semi finals
The two winners from this round progressed to meet in the final.

Final

References

Bahraini King's Cup seasons
King's Cup
Bahrain